The Toronto Harbour Commission Building is a six-storey building erected in 1917 in Toronto by Alfred Chapman for the locally run Toronto Harbour Commission. It was also used by its successor agency PortsToronto, a federal agency formerly known as the Toronto Port Authority. The lower floor is home to Harbour Sixty Steakhouse.

Formerly sitting on the waterfront, infill over the years has left the building on dry land, and civic expansion has left it dwarfed by nearby buildings.

Since 1953, the building has been rumoured to be haunted by the ghost of Thomas Cates, its former janitor, who died of natural causes while working his night shift. He is most often seen in glimpses in the north-western stairwell, where he will be sweeping or mopping the floor.

The building was sold by PortsToronto in 2017 for  million to developer Oxford Properties. It is to be part of a commercial office development named The Hub.  It was originally built at a cost of $247,000.

References

Buildings and structures in Toronto
Beaux-Arts architecture in Canada
Harbourfront, Toronto
Chapman and Oxley buildings